JMCC may refer to:

Jerusalem Media & Communication Centre, a Palestinian organization which provides information about the West Bank and in Gaza.
Journal of Molecular and Cellular Cardiology
Jurupa Mountains Cultural Center, the previous name of the Jurupa Mountains Discovery Center in Jurupa Valley, California